The Lawrence International School, Jaisinghpur (Bijapur) Kangra Himachal Pradesh  is a private co-educational day and boarding school with around 500 students in Jaisinghpur, India. It is run by the Lawrence Educational and Social Development Care society. The core members of society are:
 President: Sanjay Rana
 Vice President: Surinder Jaggi
 Secretary: Chander Pal Rihal (Rishi)
 Joint Secretary: Sunil Rana
 Associate: Saurabh Katoch (Goru)
 Principal in charge: Surinder Jaggi (acting principal since 1 July 2007)
 Vice principal= Mr. Lavekesh

Education system

The school follows the Central Board of Secondary Education system and has continuous tests and assignments.

Campus and school building
The campus is spread over two acres surrounded by ancient temples, and is situated in the heart of the Jaisinghpur subdivision.

Co-curricular activities
Swimming
Running
Yoga
Mediation

External links
  Official website

Schools in Shimla district
Private schools in Himachal Pradesh